2-Methyl-3-pentanol (IUPAC name: 2-methylpentan-3-ol) is an organic chemical compound. It is used as a fuel.

References 

Hexanols